Charlestown is a town in Washington County, Rhode Island, United States.  The population was 7,997 at the 2020 census.

History 

Charlestown is named after King Charles II, and was incorporated in 1738. The area was formerly part of the town of Westerly. It was in turn divided and the part north of the Pawcatuck River became the town of Richmond in 1747.

Geography

The town is bordered by Westerly on the west; Richmond on the north; and Hopkinton on the northwest; and South Kingstown on the east. The village of Charlestown is in the southeast part of the town, Quonochontaug is in the southwest, and Carolina is on the northern border of the town.

In 2011, Charlestown became  the first municipality in the United States to pass a ban on any size or type of electricity-generating wind turbines. The sweeping prohibition applies to large commercial as well as smaller residential turbines. This temporary measure was in order to draft a new ordinance providing for small turbines but prohibiting commercial turbines. Residential Wind Energy Facilities.
[Amended 3-14-2011 by Ord. No. 338; 9-12-2011 by Ord. No. 341; 11-14-2011 by Ord. No. 344]
Purpose. The purpose of this section is to provide for the construction and operation of wind energy facilities as accessory uses and structures for residential and agricultural uses, and to provide standards that address public health, safety and welfare in the placement, design, construction, monitoring, modification and removal of wind energy facilities and minimize negative impacts on scenic, natural and historic resources of the town.

Demographics

As of the census of 2000, there were 7,859 people, 3,178 households, and 2,278 families residing in the town. The racial makeup of the town was 96.26% White, 0.38% African American, 1.26% Native American, 0.61% Asian, 0.03% Pacific Islander, 0.53% from other races, and 0.93% from two or more races. Hispanic or Latino of any race were 1.11% of the population.

There were 3,178 households, out of which 28.3% had children under the age of 18 living with them, 60.4% were married couples living together, 7.8% had a female householder with no husband present, and 28.3% were non-families. 21.8% of all households were made up of individuals, and 8.1% had someone living alone who was 65 years of age or older.  The average household size was 2.46 and the average family size was 2.88.

In the town, the population was spread out, with 21.8% under the age of 18, 6.3% from 18 to 24, 29.4% from 25 to 44, 28.0% from 45 to 64, and 14.5% who were 65 years of age or older.  The median age was 41 years. For every 100 females, there were 98.2 males.  For every 100 females age 18 and over, there were 98.5 males.

The median income for a household in the town was $51,491, and the median income for a family was $56,866. Males had a median income of $40,616 versus $29,474 for females. The per capita income for the town was $25,642.  About 3.0% of families and 5.1% of the population were below the poverty line, including 4.7% of those under age 18 and 4.7% of those age 65 or over.

Students in Charlestown are part of the Chariho Regional School District.

Government
The town government is directed by a 5-member town council that is headed by a council president. For the purpose of school administration, Charlestown is a member town of the Chariho Regional School District along with the neighboring towns of Richmond, Hopkinton, and Wood River Junction.

Politics
Charlestown is the headquarters for the Narragansett Indian Tribe and the location of their reservation.

Law enforcement
Charlestown is served by the Charlestown Police Department. The Chief of Police is Col. Michael J. Paliotta. 
CPD is staffed by  20 sworn police officers and five full-time civilian employees.  The CPD full-time staff is supplemented with seven part-time sworn special police officers, fourteen non-sworn traffic constables and several additional part-time administrative personnel. CPD is accredited by the Rhode Island Police Accreditation Commission (RIPAC), receiving its initial accreditation in 2017.

Between the early 1900s and the mid-1970s, Charlestown had no organized full-time police department and relied solely on a part-time Chief of Police and a few appointed constables.  The Town's first Chief of Police was Chief Robert P. Day circa 1912. Since Chief Day, ten others have held the position.

Recreation

Parks
Ninigret Park, the former site of Naval Auxiliary Air Station Charlestown, is in Charlestown. It is now an extremely popular place for recreational sports games including a small beachfront, a bike track, sporting fields, and tennis courts. Along with these features, the park also contains the Frosty Drew Nature Center & Observatory. Ninigret Park is also used for the majority of large events occurring within the town of Charlestown including the Charlestown Seafood Festival, the Big Apple Circus and the Rhythm And Roots music festival.

Charlestown contains several beaches that are frequently described as "the best kept secret in Rhode Island." Miles of secluded, unspoiled, sandy beaches offer visitors a chance to enjoy many outdoor activities or just some relaxation under the sun.  Some of these beaches include town operated areas such as "Blue Shutters Town Beach" and "Charlestown Town Beach" and other are state managed areas including "East Beach State Beach" and "Charlestown Breachway State Beach."

Burlingame State Park and Campground is entirely contained inside the town of Charlestown.  The campground is 3,100 acres of rocky woodland that surrounds Watchaug Pond in Charlestown.  Activities at the park include 755 campsites, fishing, swimming, picnicking, boating and hiking. The area north of Buckeye Brook Road, abutting the Pawcatuck River, is primarily a hunting area.

Seafood Festival 

The Charlestown, RI Chamber of Commerce holds an annual seafood and lobster festival in the first week of August.  Local businesses and vendors set up booths for various seafood based events. The Seafood Festival has been named one of the Top 100 Events in America by the American Tour Bus Association in 1988, 1996 and 2008.

National Historic Places in Charlestown
Babcock House
District Schoolhouse No. 2 (1838)
Fort Ninigret
Foster Cove Archeological Site
Historic Village of the Narragansetts in Charlestown
Indian Burial Ground
Joseph Jeffrey House
Shannock Historic District
Sheffield House (1700)
Joseph Stanton House (1739)

References

External links
 
 

 
Towns in Washington County, Rhode Island
Populated coastal places in Rhode Island
Providence metropolitan area
1738 establishments in Rhode Island
Towns in Rhode Island